Frank Douglas Scott (August 25, 1878 – February 12, 1951) was a politician from the U.S. state of Michigan.

Scott was born of Scottish ancestry in Alpena, Michigan, attended the public schools and graduated from the law department of the University of Michigan at Ann Arbor in 1901.  He was admitted to the bar the same year and commenced practice in Alpena, serving as city attorney 1903-1904 and city prosecutor 1906-1910.  He also served as a member of the Michigan Senate from the 29th district, 1911–1914 and served as president pro tempore in 1913 and 1914.

In 1914, Scott was elected as a Republican from Michigan's 11th congressional district to the 64th Congress. He was subsequently re-elected to the five succeeding Congresses serving from March 4, 1915 to March 3, 1927 in the U.S. House.  During the 69th Congress, he was chairman of the Committee on Merchant Marine and Fisheries.  He was an unsuccessful candidate for re-nomination in 1926, being defeated by fellow Republican Frank P. Bohn in the primaries.

After leaving Congress, Frank D. Scott resumed the practice of his profession in Washington, D.C.  He was a member of Freemasons, Elks, and Odd Fellows.  He died at the age of seventy-two in Palm Beach, Florida and is interred at Evergreen Cemetery of Alpena.

References

The Political Graveyard

External links

 

1878 births
1951 deaths
American Freemasons
Burials in Michigan
Lawyers from Washington, D.C.
Republican Party Michigan state senators
University of Michigan Law School alumni
Michigan lawyers
Republican Party members of the United States House of Representatives from Michigan
People from Alpena, Michigan
20th-century American lawyers
20th-century American politicians